Shahrak-e Bazargan (also Romanized as Shahrak-e Bāzargān; also known as Bāzargān) is a village in Kuhestan Rural District, Rostaq District, Darab County, Fars Province, Iran. At the 2006 census, its population was 248, in 68 families.

References 

Populated places in Darab County